The  are a baseball team in the Shikoku Island League Plus of Japan. Established in 2005, the Fighting Dogs play their home games mainly at Kōchi Stadium in Kōchi city of Kōchi Prefecture.

The Dogs were the winners of the League's inaugural 2005 season. They won the 2009 season title by beating Nagasaki Saints in the Island League playoff.

Notable players
Manny Ramirez
Lars Anderson
Hideki Irabu
Frédéric Hanvi
Dioni Soriano
Katsuya Kakunaka
Takeshi Yamamoto

External links
Kōchi Fighting Dogs (in Japanese)

Baseball teams in Japan
Baseball teams established in 2005
Sports teams in Kōchi Prefecture
2005 establishments in Japan